is a Japanese manga series written and illustrated by Yūgo Kobayashi and based on a concept by Naohiko Ueno. It has been serialized in Shogakukan's seinen manga magazine Weekly Big Comic Spirits since January 2015. The series involves youth football player Ashito Aoi and his journey and experiences in the Tokyo Esperion youth academy.

An anime television series adaptation produced by Production I.G aired from April to September 2022.

By February 2023, the manga had over 17 million copies in circulation. In 2020, the manga won the 65th Shogakukan Manga Award for the general category.

Synopsis
Aoashi tells the story of young Ashito Aoi in his third year at Ehime City Middle School and his meeting with football coach Tatsuya Fukuda. Ashito, although talented, is a difficult boy, but Fukuda believes in him and invites him to join his own team. Ashito could well change the face of Japanese football.

Characters

Media

Manga
Aoashi is written and illustrated by Yūgo Kobayashi, and based on an original concept by Naohiko Ueno. It has been serialized in Shogakukan's Weekly Big Comic Spirits since January 5, 2015. Shogakukan has compiled its chapters into individual tankōbon volumes. The first volume was published on April 30, 2015. As of November 10, 2022, thirty volumes have been published. The series is licensed in Southeast Asia by Shogakukan Asia.

A spin-off manga series, also written and illustrated by Kobayashi, titled , was serialized for five chapters in Weekly Big Comic Spirits from July 12 to August 23, 2021. Its chapters were collected in a single tankōbon volume, released on August 30, 2021.

Volume list

Anime
An anime television series adaptation was announced in May 2021. The series is produced by Production I.G and directed by Akira Satō, with scripts written by Masahiro Yokotani, and character designs by Manabu Nakatake, Toshie Kawamura, Asuka Yamaguchi, and Saki Hasegawa, with Nakatake and Yamaguchi also serving as chief animation directors. Masaru Yokoyama composed the series' music. It aired from April 9 to September 24, 2022, on NHK Educational TV. The first opening theme song is "Mushin Hakusū" by Alexandros, while the first ending theme song is "Blue Diary" by Rinne. The second opening theme song is "Presence" by Superfly, while the second ending theme song is "Color Lily no Koibumi" by Kami wa Saikoro wo Furanai. Crunchyroll has licensed the series outside of Asia. Disney Platform Distribution licensed the series in Southeast Asia, Hong Kong, South Korea, and Taiwan. They began streaming the series in Indonesia, Malaysia, and Thailand from May 4, 2022; Hong Kong, Taiwan, and Singapore from June 8, 2022.

On April 11, 2022, Crunchyroll announced that the series would receive an English dub, which premiered on April 23.

Episode list

Reception
Aoashi was nominated for the 10th Manga Taishō awards in 2017; and was ranked 4th with 60 points. In 2020, along with Kaguya-sama: Love is War, the manga won the 65th Shogakukan Manga Award for the general category. The series ranked 20th on the 2022 "Book of the Year" list by Da Vinci magazine.

By April 2020, the manga had over 4.5 million copies in circulation, including digital versions; over 10 million copies in circulation, including digital versions, by February 2022; As of June 2022, the manga had over 12 million copies in circulation. over 15 million copies in circulation by August 2022; and over 17 million copies in circulation by February 2023.

In March 2023, the manga was recommended by Spanish midfielder Andrés Iniesta.

Notes

References

External links
  
  
 

2022 anime television series debuts
Anime series based on manga
Association football in anime and manga
Crunchyroll anime
NHK original programming
Production I.G
Seinen manga
Shogakukan manga
Television shows set in Ehime Prefecture
Television shows set in Tokyo
Winners of the Shogakukan Manga Award for general manga